WA Chip & Pulp Company was founded in 1969 to export woodchips from sustainable bluegum plantations after the Government of Western Australia granted a Bunnings led consortium rights to establish a woodchip project in Manjimup. In August 2000, the business was sold to Marubeni.

Before it was able to commence - environmental concerns had to be addressed, and considerable concern was raised by the organisations that opposed the project - the Campaign to Save Native Forests, South West Forests Defence Foundation, and Conservation Council of Western Australia all published materials questioning the soundness of the project.  As a consequence within a few years of commencing operation regular environmental reviews were carried out to monitor the effect of the operation.

It has maintained production for three decades, and has utilised port facilities at Bunbury for the export of its product.

Publication
 Woodchip news Perth [W.A.] : (unknown frequency) Dec. 1973, May 1974, Mar. 1975.

References

 Arthur, J. A  and  Dziatkowiec. B.(1982) . Bulk haulage of woodchips for the W.A. Chip and Pulp Co. Pty. Ltd. under the Wood Chipping Industry Agreement : project profitability and agreement review  East Perth, W.A.: Planning Division, Management Services Bureau, 1982. Project Co-ordination report ; PC 244/82 Report (Westrail. Project Coordination Section) ; PC 82/244.
 Heyligers, P C. (1977) The natural history of the Tasmanian, Manjimup and Eden-Bombala woodchip export concession areas  Canberra : A.G.P.S. 
 South-West Forests Defence Foundation (W.A.) (1979)  Non-compliance with the provisions for environmental protection in the Marri woodchip project environmental impact statement South-West Forests Defence Foundation. Nedlands, W.A.   
 (1988)  The West Australian woodchip industry : WA Chip & Pulp Co Pty Ltd : report and recommendations of the Environmental Protection Authority. Perth, W.A : The Authority. Bulletin / Environmental Protection Authority, Western Australia, 1030-0120. 
 W.A. Chip & Pulp Co. (1981) Forest management : an introduction to silviculture and the W.A. woodchip export project  Manjimup : W.A. Chip & Pulp Co.

Economic history of Western Australia
Marubeni
Wesfarmers
1969 establishments in Australia